Randal D. Rauser is a Canadian Baptist theologian who serves as an associate professor of historical theology at Taylor Seminary.

Work
Rauser wrote a guide to The Shack in his companion volume Finding God in the Shack (Paternoster, 2009). In the book Rauser responds to many of the objections raised by critics like Chuck Colson and Albert Mohler. Rauser has written a book with the ex-Christian minister and atheist polemicist John W. Loftus and debated him on radio. Rauser has attempted to persuade people to practise analytic philosophy.

Reception

Eugene H. Peterson praised Rauser as a "skilled and accessible theologian." Dean Zimmerman praised Rauser as having the "intellectual honesty to face up to the genuine difficulties confronting his faith." Rauser and Peter Enns have discussed their views on biblical inerrancy.

References

External links
 

21st-century Canadian male writers
21st-century Canadian non-fiction writers
21st-century Protestant theologians
Alumni of King's College London
Canadian Baptist theologians
Canadian evangelicals
Living people
Seminary academics
Trinity Western University alumni
Year of birth missing (living people)